Paul John Williams (born 16 November 1962) is an English former professional footballer who played in the Football League as a defender.

References

Sources
Paul Williams, Neil Brown

1962 births
Living people
English footballers
Association football defenders
Chelsea F.C. players
Woking F.C. players
Leatherhead F.C. players
English Football League players